Enfant terrible is a French expression, traditionally referring to a child who is terrifyingly candid by saying embarrassing things to parents or others. However, the expression has drawn multiple usage in careers of art, fashion, music, and other creative arts. In these careers, it implies a successful, and often young, "genius" who is very unorthodox, striking, and in some cases, offensive, or rebellious.

The Oxford English Dictionary, 2nd edition, gives the definition: "A child who embarrasses his elders by untimely remarks; transf. a person who compromises his associates or his party by unorthodox or ill-considered speech or behaviour; loosely, one who acts unconventionally."

One of Webster's Dictionary definitions of enfant terrible is "a usually young and successful person who is strikingly unorthodox, innovative, or avant-garde".

See also
Les Enfants Terribles (disambiguation)

References

French words and phrases

sv:Lista över franska uttryck i svenska språket#E